IF Haga, also known as IF Hagapojkarna, is a Swedish football club located in Jönköping.

Background
Idrottsföreningen Hagapojkarna were founded in 1920 but ceased to operate in the mid-1930s. The club was re-formed in 1944. Over the years it has pursued bandy and ice hockey but now football is the only remaining section. The club has around 1,000 members, most of whom live in Ljungarum.  The previous name IF Hagapojkarna was amended to IF Haga at the 2009 Annual Meeting.

Since their foundation IF Haga has participated mainly in the middle and lower divisions of the Swedish football league system. They play their home matches at the Strömsbergsvallen in Jönköping.

IF Haga are affiliated to Smålands Fotbollförbund.

Recent history
In recent seasons IF Haga have competed in the following divisions:

2013 – Division III, Nordöstra Götaland
2012 – Division II,  Östra Götaland
2011 – Division III, Nordöstra Götaland
2010 – Division III, Nordöstra Götaland
2009 – Division III, Nordöstra Götaland
2008 – Division III, Nordöstra Götaland
2007 – Division IV, Småland Västra Elit
2007 – Division IV, Småland Elit Norra
2006 – Division III, Nordöstra Götaland
2005 – Division III, Nordöstra Götaland
2004 – Division III, Nordöstra Götaland
2003 – Division III, Mellersta Götaland
2002 – Division III, Sydvästra Götaland
2001 – Division III, Nordöstra Götaland
2000 – Division IV, Småland Nordvästra
1999 – Division III, Sydvästra Götaland
1998 – Division III, Sydvästra Götaland

Attendance
In recent seasons IF Haga have had the following average attendances:

Footnotes

External links
 IF Haga – Official website

Football clubs in Jönköping County
Association football clubs established in 1920
Bandy clubs established in 1920
Association football clubs established in 1944
Bandy clubs established in 1944
Ice hockey clubs established in 1944
1920 establishments in Sweden
Defunct bandy clubs in Sweden
Defunct ice hockey teams in Sweden